Geneviéve LaChelle Jones-Wright is a San Diego, California native who served San Diego County as a public defender from 2006 to 2019. Jones-Wright co-founded and serves as the Executive Director of an impact litigation non-profit, Community Advocates for Just and Moral Governance www.moralgovernance.org, also known as MoGo. MoGo works to achieve racial and social justice and holds government accountable to all people, especially those who are marginalized. Jones-Wright ran to become the District Attorney of San Diego in the June 5, 2018 primary election against interim District Attorney Summer Stephan after the position was vacated by Bonnie Dumanis in July 2017. Jones-Wright lost the primary 62.62% to 37.02%.  She is a Democrat who is considered a progressive reformist, though the District Attorney position is non-partisan.

Biography 
Geneviéve Jones-Wright is a lifelong San Diego native who was raised and lives in southeastern San Diego. She was raised by a young, single mother who worked as a cafeteria worker at Lincoln High School. Jones-Wright decided to pursue the law when she was 8 years old after feeling inspired by U.S. Supreme Court Justice Thurgood Marshall. She graduated from Patrick Henry High School, received a bachelor's degree from the University of San Francisco, received a law degree from Howard University School of Law, and received a Master of Laws from California Western School of Law.

Jones-Wright became a public defender in San Diego in 2006. She sits on San Diego’s Commission on Gang Prevention and Intervention and is a volunteer legal reviewer for the California Innocence Project. On March 21, 2021 she was inducted into the San Diego County Women's Hall of Fame in recognition of her transformative activism.

In January 2016, Jones-Wright was driving home from Mission Beach and got pulled over by police in front of Malcolm X Library in Valencia Park off Euclid Avenue, a road famous for entrapping SDSU students for alleged DUIs. She was handcuffed at gunpoint due to a reported DMV error that her license plates were stolen after being profiled by police officers; an incident she recorded and published to her Facebook page.

Run for San Diego District Attorney 
Geneviéve Jones-Wright announced her candidacy to become the District Attorney of San Diego, California in July 2017 against Summer Stephan, who was chosen to be interim District Attorney by Bonnie Dumanis when she stepped down in 2017. Jones-Wright is a Democrat who is considered a progressive reformist. She has stated that the justice system should be reformed to work to improve public safety and rehabilitation as opposed to increasing prosecutions. She has pushed to test every rape kit in San Diego. Jones-Wright has stated that voluntary sex workers in San Diego should be allowed to make their own choices as opposed to being treated like criminals. She has been noted for being against the War on Drugs and defending the state's cannabis laws against federal intervention. She would also like to roll back cannabis convictions. She has criticized previous District Attorneys for choosing not to investigate police shootings.

Jones-Wright and her candidacy has been described as part of a Reformist wave in DA elections across the U.S. Malcolm Jenkins spoke about how the criminal justice system needs change from within to correct systemic racism, and pointed to Jones-Wright's run in San Diego as a key race. Jones-Wright has been endorsed by the San Diego Democratic Party, California Senator Kamala Harris, George Soros, Assemblymember Lorena Gonzalez-Fletcher and Governor Gavin Newsom.

References 

Living people
Public defenders
People from San Diego
University of San Francisco alumni
Howard University School of Law alumni
21st-century American lawyers
African-American women lawyers
African-American lawyers
Year of birth missing (living people)
21st-century American women lawyers
21st-century African-American women
21st-century African-American people